Güby is a municipality in the district of Rendsburg-Eckernförde, in Schleswig-Holstein, Germany.

Güby is west of the municipality of Fleckeby, but north of Hummelfeld.

References

Municipalities in Schleswig-Holstein
Rendsburg-Eckernförde